This is a list of 137 species in Laemosaccus, a genus of true weevils in the family Curculionidae.

Laemosaccus species

 Laemosaccus aciculaticollis Hustache, 1937 c
 Laemosaccus affaber Boheman, 1844 c
 Laemosaccus albiventris Hustache, 1937 c
 Laemosaccus angulatus Janczyk, 1959 c
 Laemosaccus angustifrons Hustache, 1938 c
 Laemosaccus argenteus Lea, A.M., 1896 c
 Laemosaccus ater Lea, A.M., 1896 c
 Laemosaccus atratus Champion, G.C., 1903 c
 Laemosaccus aureus Hustache, 1937 c
 Laemosaccus australis Boisduval, 1835 c
 Laemosaccus basalis Hustache, 1937 c
 Laemosaccus bidentatus Lea, 1927 c
 Laemosaccus bilobus Lea, A.M., 1899 c
 Laemosaccus biseriatus Lea, 1927 c
 Laemosaccus blandus Pascoe, F.P., 1886 c
 Laemosaccus brasiliensis Hustache, 1937 c
 Laemosaccus brevipennis Pascoe, F.P., 1870 c
 Laemosaccus brevis Lea, A.M., 1899 c
 Laemosaccus bufonius Janczyk, 1959 c
 Laemosaccus calotrichus Lea, 1927 c
 Laemosaccus canaliculatus Hustache, 1937 c
 Laemosaccus carinicollis Lea, A.M., 1896 c
 Laemosaccus carinipyga Hustache, 1937 c
 Laemosaccus castaneipennis Hustache, 1937 c
 Laemosaccus castaneus Philippi, 1864 c
 Laemosaccus catenatus Pascoe, F.P., 1871 c
 Laemosaccus chadwicki Janczyk, 1966 c
 Laemosaccus chevrolati Guérin-Méneville, F.E., 1829-44 c
 Laemosaccus chevrolatii Guérin-Méneville, 1844 c
 Laemosaccus compactus Lea, A.M., 1896 c
 Laemosaccus copturoides Voss, 1937 c
 Laemosaccus cossonoides Lea, A.M., 1896 c
 Laemosaccus crassicollis Blanchard, E. in Gay, 1851 c
 Laemosaccus crassirostris Bovie in Wytsman, 1909 c
 Laemosaccus cristaticollis Blanchard, E. in Gay, 1851 c
 Laemosaccus crucicollis Lea, A.M., 1896 c
 Laemosaccus cryptonyx Pascoe, F.P., 1872 c
 Laemosaccus cylindricus Lea, 1927 c
 Laemosaccus cylindrirostris Lea, 1927 c
 Laemosaccus dapsilis Pascoe, F.P., 1872 c
 Laemosaccus drewsi Bondar, 1947 c
 Laemosaccus dubius Lea, A.M., 1896 c
 Laemosaccus ebenus Pascoe, F.P., 1886 c
 Laemosaccus electilis Pascoe, F.P., 1871 c
 Laemosaccus erythronotus Champion, G.C., 1903 c
 Laemosaccus exaratus Champion, G.C., 1903 c
 Laemosaccus exsculptus Champion, G.C., 1903 c
 Laemosaccus festivus Lea, A.M., 1896 c
 Laemosaccus frater Lea, A.M., 1899 c
 Laemosaccus frontalis Kirsch, T., 1875 c
 Laemosaccus fulvirostris Pascoe, F.P., 1873 c
 Laemosaccus funereus Pascoe, F.P., 1873 c
 Laemosaccus fuscicornis Hustache, 1937 c
 Laemosaccus germari Boheman, 1844 c
 Laemosaccus gibbosus Pascoe, F.P., 1873 c
 Laemosaccus guyanensis Hustache, 1937 c
 Laemosaccus hamatus Champion, G.C., 1903 c
 Laemosaccus haustellatus Lea, 1927 c
 Laemosaccus hieroglyphicus Lea, 1911 c
 Laemosaccus imitator Lea, 1927 c
 Laemosaccus instabilis Lea, A.M., 1896 c
 Laemosaccus insularis Pascoe, F.P., 1885 c
 Laemosaccus janczyki Wibmer & O'Brien, 1986 c
 Laemosaccus judaicus Lea, A.M., 1899 c
 Laemosaccus lacertosus Janczyk, 1959 c
 Laemosaccus latirostris Lea, 1927 c
 Laemosaccus leucopectoralis Voss, 1937 c
 Laemosaccus longiceps Pascoe, F.P., 1873 c
 Laemosaccus longimanus Pascoe, F.P., 1872 c
 Laemosaccus lucens Hustache, 1937 c
 Laemosaccus maculatus Champion, G.C., 1903 c
 Laemosaccus magdaloides Pascoe, F.P., 1873 c
 Laemosaccus marmoratus Lea, 1927 c
 Laemosaccus melanocephalus Lea, A.M., 1899 c
 Laemosaccus microps Lea, 1927 c
 Laemosaccus narinus Pascoe, F.P., 1872 c
 Laemosaccus nephele (Herbst, 1797) i c g
 Laemosaccus nigriceps Lea, 1911 c
 Laemosaccus nigrirostris Lea, 1927 c
 Laemosaccus nigrotuberosus Fairmaire, L., 1883 c
 Laemosaccus niveonotatus Lea, 1927 c
 Laemosaccus notatus Pascoe, F.P., 1871 c
 Laemosaccus obscurus Lea, A.M., 1896 c
 Laemosaccus obsoletus Blanchard, E. in Gay, 1851 c
 Laemosaccus occidentalis Lea, A.M., 1896 c
 Laemosaccus ocularis Pascoe, F.P., 1873 c
 Laemosaccus pascoei Hustache, 1937 c
 Laemosaccus peccuarius Pascoe, F.P., 1871 c
 Laemosaccus persimilis Hustache, 1937 c
 Laemosaccus peruvianus Hustache, 1937 c
 Laemosaccus petulans Pascoe, F.P., 1885 c
 Laemosaccus pictus Hustache, 1937 c
 Laemosaccus plagiatus Schoenherr, 1823 c
 Laemosaccus pruinosus Blanchard, E. in Gay, 1851 c
 Laemosaccus pubicollis Lea, 1927 c
 Laemosaccus pullus Hustache, 1937 c
 Laemosaccus pustulatus Gyllenhal, 1836 c
 Laemosaccus quadripustulatus Schoenherr, 1839 c
 Laemosaccus quadriseriatus Lea, 1927 c
 Laemosaccus querulus Pascoe, F.P., 1873 c
 Laemosaccus radiatus Champion, G.C., 1903 c
 Laemosaccus rivularis Lea, A.M., 1899 c
 Laemosaccus rufescens Pascoe, F.P., 1886 c
 Laemosaccus ruficornis Champion, G.C., 1903 c
 Laemosaccus rufipennis Lea, A.M., 1896 c
 Laemosaccus rufipes Lea, A.M., 1896 c
 Laemosaccus rufirostris Lea, 1927 c
 Laemosaccus rufus Boheman, 1844 c
 Laemosaccus salebrosus Champion, G.C., 1903 c
 Laemosaccus scriptus Champion, G.C., 1903 c
 Laemosaccus sculpturatus Champion, G.C., 1903 c
 Laemosaccus scutellaris Lea, 1927 c
 Laemosaccus semicrudus Lea, 1927 c
 Laemosaccus semirufus Hustache, 1937 c
 Laemosaccus semiustus Pascoe, F.P., 1873 c
 Laemosaccus silbermanni Chevrolat in Guérin-Méneville, F.E., 1829-44 c
 Laemosaccus silbermannii Chevrolat in Guérin-Méneville, 1844 c
 Laemosaccus subcylindricus Lea, 1927 c
 Laemosaccus subsignatus Boheman, 1844 c
 Laemosaccus sulcifrons Champion, 1910 c
 Laemosaccus synopticus Pascoe, F.P., 1870 c
 Laemosaccus tantulus Pascoe, F.P., 1870 c
 Laemosaccus tarsalis Pascoe, F.P., 1873 c
 Laemosaccus tenuirostris Lea, 1927 c
 Laemosaccus texanus Champion, 1903 i c b
 Laemosaccus thorey Janczyk, 1957 c
 Laemosaccus triangulatus Janczyk, 1957 c
 Laemosaccus triseriatus Lea, 1927 c
 Laemosaccus tropicus Lea, 1911 c
 Laemosaccus trucidatus Schoenherr, 1844 c
 Laemosaccus unicolor Blanchard, E. in Gay, 1851 c
 Laemosaccus ustulus Pascoe, F.P., 1871 c
 Laemosaccus variabilis Lea, A.M., 1896 c
 Laemosaccus variegatus Lea, A.M., 1899 c
 Laemosaccus varius Bovie in Wytsman, 1909 c
 Laemosaccus ventralis Lea, A.M., 1896 c
 Laemosaccus virgulatus Hustache, 1937 c

Data sources: i = ITIS, c = Catalogue of Life, g = GBIF, b = Bugguide.net

References

Laemosaccu
Articles created by Qbugbot